Video Star is a South Korean talk show hosted by Kim Sook, Park Na-rae, Park So-hyun, and Sandara Park. It airs on the MBC cable channel MBC every1 on Tuesdays at 20:30 (KST). The first episode aired on July 12, 2016.

Video Star is a spin-off program based on the concept of the MBC program Radio Star.

Cast

Host 

 Current hosts:
 Kim Sook (Episode 1 - present)
 Park Na-rae (Episode 1 - present)
 Park So-hyun (Episode 1 - present)
 Sandara Park (Episode 130 - present)
 Former hosts:
 Cao Lu (Episode 1 - 14)
 Jun Hyo-seong (Episode 15 - 90)
 Sunny (Episode 91 - 115)
Kim Min-young as (Cameo)

Timeline

List of episodes

References 

2016 South Korean television series debuts
Korean-language television shows
South Korean television talk shows
South Korean variety television shows